

2007 schedule 
Not all race names and sponsors are officially announced.

Season notes 
 On January 12, 2007 the Indy Racing League announced a new wing package for the Indy Pro Series.
 Indy Pro Series teams and drivers competed for 3.7 million dollars, a 24 percent increase from 2006.
 A record 25 cars entered the Miami 100 on March 24.

Drivers and teams 
All teams competed in Firestone-shod Dallaras.

Race summaries

Round 1 of 16: Miami 100 
Saturday March 24, 2007
Homestead-Miami Speedway, Homestead, Florida
Race weather: 78 °F, fair skies
Pole position winner: #9 Chris Festa 28.5455 sec 187.280 mph (301.398 km/h)
Race Summary: The race which saw a Pro Series record 25 entries was marred by two major incidents. The first occurred when Wade Cunningham lost control of his car. Ryan Justice made contact with a large piece of debris from Cunningham's car and made hard contact with the wall at the exit of turn 2. He was unconscious as he was removed from the car but regained consciousness on the way to the infield care center. The next incident came just two laps after the end of the lengthy caution following the first incident. Sean Guthrie and Pablo Pérez Companc made contact between turns one and two and Perez's car launched over Guthrie's and into the catch fence. Perez was transported to the hospital with leg injuries. The race was prematurely ended after 57 laps due to damage to the catch fence from the second incident with Alex Lloyd leading and gaining his first IPS victory on an oval.

Round 2 of 16: St. Petersburg Grand Prix 1 
Saturday March 31, 2007
Streets of St. Petersburg, St. Petersburg, Florida
Race weather: 80 °F, mostly sunny
Pole position winner: #7 Alex Lloyd 1:07.1404 sec 96.514 mph (155.324 km/h)
Race Summary: Alex Lloyd dominated the first race at St. Petersburg leading all 40 laps of the race and winning from pole position. Lloyd held off Super Aguri Panther Racing's Hideki Mutoh for the final 22 laps. Mutoh had the best chance to take the win away from Lloyd but it just was not meant to be. Lloyd now has 3 wins in a row dating back to the final race of 2006.

Round 3 of 16: St. Petersburg Grand Prix 2 
Saturday April 1, 2007
Streets of St. Petersburg, St. Petersburg, Florida
Race weather: 79 °F, sunny
Pole position winner: Bobby Wilson Top 6 finishers from Race 1 inverted
Race Summary: Alex Lloyd had the car to beat in St. Petersburg, winning both races of the double-header. Lloydhad to start race 2 from 6th place because of the inverted field after race 1, but that didn't stop him from getting to the front. On lap 21 of 40 Lloyd took the lead and was never to lose it, winning now the first 3 races of 2007.

Round 4 of 16: Freedom 100 
Friday May 25, 2007
Indianapolis Motor Speedway, Indianapolis, Indiana
Race weather: 82 °F, cloudy with scattered showers
Pole position winner: #52 Ken Losch 188.231 mph (302.928 km/h)
Race Summary:

Round 5 of 16: Road Runner 100 
Saturday June 2, 2007
Milwaukee Mile, West Allis, Wisconsin
Race weather: , partly cloudy
Pole position winner: #7 Alex Lloyd 146.077 mph (235.088 km/h)
Race Summary: On turn 2 of the first lap Hideki Mutoh spun in front of most of the field, collecting 5 cars including Jaime Camara and Chris Festa. Jon Brownson shortly after the restart on lap 11. On lap 17 the race restarted and ran green until lap 81, during which time leader Alex Lloyd was able to pull out a 4 second lead on his closest pursuer Mike Potekhen and lap all but 3 of his competitors, cruising to his 5th straight victory to start the season. Lloyd now holds the league record for consecutive wins and sits second on the series all-time wins list.

Round 6 of 16: Liberty Challenge Race 1 
Saturday June 16, 2007
Indianapolis Motor Speedway, Speedway, Indiana
Race weather: , Hazy
Pole position winner: #55 Hideki Mutoh 109.966 mph (176.973 km/h)
Race Summary:

Round 7 of 16: Liberty Challenge Race 2 
Saturday June 17, 2007
Indianapolis Motor Speedway, Speedway, Indiana
Race weather: , Hazy
Pole position winner: #38 Ryan Justice (8th place in race 1)
Race Summary:

Round 8 of 16: Iowa 100 
Saturday June 23, 2007
Iowa Speedway, Newton, Iowa
Race weather: , overcast, humid
Pole position winner: #27 Wade Cunningham 19.9522 sec 161.306 mph (259.597 km/h)
Race Summary: Wade Cunningham started from the pole and led the first 104 of the 115 laps, but was passed on the bottom by Alex Lloyd, who pulled away to capture his sixth victory of the season. On lap 79, Sean Guthrie lost control on the front straight while running fourth and lapping Mike Potekhen and shot across the infield and slammed into the inside wall. He walked away from the incident on his own power, but underwent X-Rays and was diagnosed with a displaced fracture of his left foot. Lloyd now has more Pro Series wins than any other driver.

Round 9 of 16: Corning Twin 100's Race 1 
Saturday July 7, 2007
Watkins Glen International, Watkins Glen, New York
Race weather:
Pole position winner: #27 Wade Cunningham 1 min 36.7418 sec 125.406 mph (201.821 km/h)
Race Summary: Polesitter Wade Cunningham held off a hard-charging Hideki Mutoh to capture his first win of the season and fifth of his career. The only major incident of the race came on lap 8 when Chris Festa spun coming out of turn 1 and hit the inside guard rail.

Round 10 of 16: Corning Twin 100's Race 2 
Sunday July 9, 2007
Watkins Glen International, Watkins Glen, New York
Race weather:
Pole position winner: #44 Daniel Herrington (6th place in race 1)
Race Summary: On lap 3, Alex Lloyd  was able to get by polesitter Daniel Herrington and pull away from his closest pursuer, race 1 winner Wade Cunningham, to capture his seventh win of the season and further extend his points lead.

Round 11 of 16: Sun Belt Rentals 100 
Saturday July 14, 2007
Nashville Superspeedway, Lebanon, Tennessee
Race weather: , Sunny
Pole position winner: #7 Alex Lloyd 25.7368 sec 181.841 mph (292.645 km/h)
Race Summary:

Round 12 of 16: Mid Ohio 100 
Saturday July 21, 2007
Mid-Ohio Sports Car Course, Lexington, Ohio
Race weather: , Partly Cloudy
Pole position winner: #7 Alex Lloyd 110.188 mph (177.330 km/h)
Race Summary:

Round 13 of 16: Kentucky 100 
Saturday August 11, 2007
Kentucky Speedway, Sparta, Kentucky
Race weather:
Pole position winner: #55 Hideki Mutoh 191.276 mph (307.829 km/h)
Race Summary:

Round 14 of 16: Carneros 100 
Saturday August 25, 2007
Infineon Raceway, Sonoma, California
Race weather: 85 °F, sunny
Pole position winner: #51 Richard Antinucci 1:22.2742 100.639 mph (161.963 km/h)
Race Summary: Alex Lloyd passed Richard Antinucci on the first lap and never looked back, leading all 30 laps en route to the victory while clinching the championship.

Round 15 of 16: Valley of the Moon 100 
Sunday August 26, 2007
Infineon Raceway, Sonoma, California
Race weather: 71 °F, mostly sunny
Pole position winner: #38 Ryan Justice (8th place in Race 1)
Race Summary: The first eight positions from the first race were inverted to determine the grid for race 2. Alex Lloyd's car had engine trouble on the pace lap and he failed to start the race. Richard Antinucci steadily climbed through the field from the seventh starting position, eventually finding his way past polesitter Ryan Justice on lap 18 to take the lead and capture his second win of the season.

Round 16 of 16: Chicagoland 100 
Sunday September 9, 2007
Chicagoland Speedway, Joliet, Illinois
Race weather: 75 °F, sunny
Pole position winner: #7 Alex Lloyd 28.7799 sec 190.133 mph (305.989 km/h)
Race Summary: The Sam Schmidt Motorsports cars of champion Alex Lloyd and Logan Gomez battled for the lead with Robbie Pecorari throughout the race, which was slowed by two extended caution flags, the first caused by a major crash involving Chris Festa and Jaime Camara and the second involving Travis Gregg and Wade Cunningham. Gomez led his teammate entering the final lap. Lloyd mounted a challenge and the two cars briefly touched exiting turn four and Gomez was able to hold off Lloyd for his first Pro Series victory by a mere 0.0005 sec. The league claims that this finish is the closest in motor racing history.

Driver Standings 

 Ties in points broken by number of wins, or best finishes.

See also 
 Indy Racing League
 Indy Pro Series
 2007 in sports
 2007 IndyCar Series
 2007 in Champ Car
 2007 in NASCAR

References

External links 
Indy Racing League- official site

Indy Lights seasons
IPS
Indy Pro Series